A roast is a form of humor in which a specific individual, a guest of honor, is subjected to jokes at their expense, intended to amuse the event's wider audience. Such events are intended to honor a specific individual in a unique way. In addition to jokes and insult comedy, such events may also involve genuine praise and tributes. The implication is that the roastee is able to take the jokes in good humor and not as serious criticism or insult. The individual is surrounded by friends, fans, and well-wishers, who can receive some of the same treatment as well during the course of the evening. The party and presentation itself are both referred to as a roast. The host of the event is called the roastmaster, a pun on toastmaster. Anyone who is mocked in such a way is said to have been roasted.

There is a parallel tradition in some countries in which the host of formal events, such as award ceremonies and annual dinners, is expected to good-naturedly mock the event's attendees. In some cases, this has caused controversy when the host is seen as being too insulting. There is also a concept of roasting on internet social media, where a person asks others to mock them, usually by putting up a photo of  themselves. Though the mockery is solicited, this activity, too, has caused controversy, with some considering it a form of cyberbullying. Even more controversial is the practice of simply insulting others for comedic effect, which some have referred to as "roasting", though comedians have stressed that a true roast requires the consent of the target.

History

In 1949, the New York Friars Club held its first roast with French singer Maurice Chevalier as the guest of honor.

Televised roasts

Kraft Music Hall
The final few seasons of the television show Kraft Music Hall, from 1968 to 1971, included broadcasts of the Friars Club Roast; the celebrities roasted included Johnny Carson, Milton Berle, Jack Benny, Don Rickles, and Jerry Lewis.

Dean Martin's Celebrity Roasts
Dean Martin hosted a series of roasts on television in 1974 as part   of the final season of his self-titled variety show. After the show was cancelled, NBC decided to schedule a series of The Dean Martin Celebrity Roast specials from the former MGM Grand Hotel and Casino (now Horseshoe Las Vegas) in the Ziegfeld Room; these were recorded and aired approximately once every two months from late 1974 to early 1979, and another three were produced in 1984. The celebrities roasted included actors Kirk Douglas, Bette Davis, and Jimmy Stewart; athletes Muhammad Ali, Joe Namath, and Wilt Chamberlain; comedians Lucille Ball, Jackie Gleason, and Redd Foxx; politicians Ronald Reagan and Barry Goldwater; and singers Frank Sinatra and Martin himself. The humor at these broadcast tributes was far tamer than the sometimes extremely vulgar and explicit language of the private, non-televised ones.

Comedy Central

From 1998 to 2002, the cable channel Comedy Central produced and broadcast the annual roast of the New York Friars Club, with roasts of the celebrities Drew Carey, Jerry Stiller, Rob Reiner, Hugh Hefner, and Chevy Chase.

Based on the success of these roasts, Comedy Central began hosting their own roasts on an approximately annual basis, under the name Comedy Central Roast. The first roastee was Denis Leary in 2003, followed by Jeff Foxworthy, Pamela Anderson, William Shatner, Flavor Flav, Bob Saget, Larry the Cable Guy, Joan Rivers, David Hasselhoff, Donald Trump, Charlie Sheen, Roseanne Barr, James Franco, Justin Bieber, Rob Lowe, Bruce Willis, and Alec Baldwin.

Comedian Jeff Ross notably gained fame through his participation in the televised Comedy Central roasts, and is frequently referred to as the "Roastmaster General" (a position he in fact holds with the New York Friars' Club).

In 2010, Comedy Central's international affiliates began to produce and air their own local roasts as well. Comedy Central New Zealand has aired roasts of Mike King and Murray Mexted, Comedy Central Africa has aired roasts of Steve Hofmeyr, Kenny Kunene, Somizi Mhlongo, AKA and Khanyi Mbau, Comedy Central Latin America has aired a roast of Héctor Suárez, Comedy Central Spain has aired roasts of Santiago Segura, El Gran Wyoming, and José Mota, and Comedy Central Netherlands has aired roasts of Gordon (which was the highest-watched broadcast in the history of the channel), Giel Beelen, Johnny de Mol, Ali B and Hans Klok.

Other televised roasts in the United States
The fourth (and final) episode of The Richard Pryor Show in 1977 was a roast of host Richard Pryor.

Playboy produced one roast in 1986, of Tommy Chong, which aired on the Playboy Channel.

Basketball player Shaquille O'Neal produced two editions of his Shaq's All Star Comedy Roast: of himself in 2002, and of Emmitt Smith in 2003.

The cable channel MTV produced one roast in 2003, of Carson Daly, which was billed as the MTV Bash.

The cable channel TBS produced one roast in 2008, of Cheech & Chong, which was billed as Cheech & Chong: Roasted.

The cable channel A&E produced one roast in 2008, of Gene Simmons.

The magazine Guitar World organized three "Rock & Roll Roasts" from 2012 to 2014, of musicians Zakk Wylde, Dee Snider, and Corey Taylor.

A Friars Club roast of Terry Bradshaw was broadcast on ESPN2 in 2015.

The cable channel Fusion aired a roast of Snoop Dogg in 2016, billed as the Snoop Dogg Smokeout.

RuPaul's Drag Race has aired five roast-themed episodes: A roast of RuPaul in season 5 in 2013 and in RuPaul's Secret Celebrity Drag Race in 2020, a roast of Michelle Visage in season 9 in 2017, a mock-funeral roast of Lady Bunny in season 4 of All-Stars in 2019 and a Nice Girls Roast in season 13.

The cable channel TNT aired a roast of the anchors of the TNT show Inside the NBA in 2020.

United Kingdom
Some attempts have been made to adapt the American roast format to a British audience. Channel 4 launched the latest British version on April 7, 2010 with A Comedy Roast, with initial victims being Bruce Forsyth, Sharon Osbourne, and Chris Tarrant. Davina McCall and Barbara Windsor were other victims.

The television series Roast Battle ran for four series from 2018 to 2020 on the British channel Comedy Central. It was an adaptation of the US series Jeff Ross Presents Roast Battle.

India
The Indian comedy group All India Bakchod organized the live show AIB Knockout in January 2015 featuring Arjun Kapoor and Ranveer Singh with Karan Johar as the roastmaster. The programme caused a controversy for allegedly featuring distasteful, sexist, offending, and humiliating content. Videos of the event were removed from YouTube. Comedy Nights Bachao by Optimystix Productions is also based on this format; however, they avoid going too racy to keep the show family friendly.

China
Artists and producers working for Shanghai Xiao Guo Culture Co. Ltd., started importing foreign stand-up comedy formats since 2012. Roast!, a Chinese version of Comedy Central Roasts, has reached 2.33 billion hits on Tencent's video streaming platform, according to Maoyan, a movie and TV site. Roast! differs in that, instead of a single annual special, it consists of annual seasons of 10 shows with a different celebrity victim – typically singers or actors – each week (season one contains 11 including a triple-length Chinese New Year special). Its offspring, web show Rock & Roast, has also become a hit in China, with 70 million viewers in its 2019 season a steady increase from 50 million from its prior season.

Fictional roasts
Roasts have sometimes been portrayed in fictional TV shows. In other cases, standalone roasts have been produced of historical characters, with both roastee and roasters played by actors.

The Dean Martin Celebrity Roast aired one fictional roast, of George Washington (played by Jan Leighton), on March 15, 1974.

Part 2 of the 1979 TV special Legends of the Superheroes was a roast of various DC Comics superhero characters, hosted by Ed McMahon.

The 1997 episode "The Roast" of the series The Larry Sanders Show revolved around a roast of the title character (Garry Shandling). The main plot of the 2013 episode "Correspondents' Lunch" of the NBC sitcom Parks and Recreation involves protagonist Leslie Knope (Amy Poehler) roasting the media of the fictional town of Pawnee in a local correspondents' lunch. In the 2009 episode "Stress Relief" of The Office, main character Michael Scott (Steve Carell) organizes a roast of himself.

The 2019 Netflix series Historical Roasts, hosted by Jeff Ross, featured roasts of historical figures Abraham Lincoln (played by Bob Saget), Freddie Mercury (James Adomian), Anne Frank (Rachel Feinstein), Martin Luther King Jr. (Jerry Minor), Cleopatra (Ayden Mayeri), and Muhammad Ali (Jaleel White).

In politics
The White House Correspondents' Association and Radio and Television Correspondents' Association have annual dinners that, in some years, feature a comedy roasting of the U.S. President. Don Imus at the RTCA in 1996, Stephen Colbert in 2006 and Michelle Wolf in 2018 have received particular attention for their biting remarks during their speeches.

During presidential election years in the U.S., it is customary for both major party candidates to attend the Alfred E. Smith Memorial Foundation Dinner, typically engaging in a roast of each other, and occasionally themselves.

References

 
Stand-up comedy